Coopers Edge is a newly built suburb, located in Brockworth, between the city of Gloucester and the town of Cheltenham. Construction began in 2007 at the foot of Coopers Hill.

Transport 

The area has rudimentary road transport links, it is situated less than 2 miles from the M5 motorway and the A419 which leads to Swindon and connects to the A40 to Oxford. There is also a regular bus service into the city centre.

Location

Coopers Edge is in an area of outstanding natural beauty, with easy access to a network of footpaths and bridleways. There are due to be large designated areas of public open space, with special efforts being made to preserve the natural habitat of the wildlife in the area.

Local area

Coopers Edge is a short walk from a large superstore, business park and the newly developed Whittle Square, consisting of various retail outlets, a pub/restaurant and health & fitness centre.

Community

There is a Community centre, @The Edge Community Centre, which consists of a community cafe, sports hall, meeting rooms and garden. There are many sports clubs and societies which run out of it, including football, martial arts, yoga, gymnastics, a branch of the Women's Institute and local faith groups.

External links
 http://www.attheedge.community/ Coopers Edge Community Centre Website

Areas of Gloucester
Suburbs in the United Kingdom
Housing estates in Gloucestershire